was a soldier in the Imperial Japanese Army memorialized by the Memorial Statue of the Hakkoda Death March in Aomori, Japan.

In January 1902, 210 soldiers in the 5th Infantry Regiment, 2nd Battalion became trapped on the Hakkōda Mountains; this was the start of the Hakkōda Mountains incident. Search parties discovered Gotō. The discovery led to the rescue of the other soldiers. His arms and legs were amputated as a result of frostbite.

After the incident, he retired from the army, returned to his hometown, became a member of the village assembly, and later died from cerebral hemorrhage.

In Jirō Nitta's Death March on Mount Hakkōda: A Documentary Novel, a semi-fictional account of the disaster, Gotō is portrayed by the character Corporal Etō.

References 

Japanese soldiers
Military personnel from Miyagi Prefecture
Japanese amputees
1879 births
1924 deaths
Quadruple amputees